Larutia puehensis, also known as the Berumput two-toed skink, is a species of skink. It is only known from holotype collected from Gunung Berumput (=Mt. Berumput) in Pueh Mountains, Sarawak, Malaysian Borneo.

References

puehensis
Reptiles of Borneo
Reptiles of Malaysia
Endemic fauna of Borneo
Endemic fauna of Malaysia
Reptiles described in 2003
Taxa named by Jesse L. Grismer
Taxa named by Tzi Ming Leong
Taxa named by Norsham S. Yaakob